"Stuff Like That" is a hit song with music and lyrics written by Quincy Jones, Ashford & Simpson, Steve Gadd, Eric Gale, Ralph MacDonald and Richard Tee. The song was originally an instrumental rhythm track.  Jones worked on the track with Ashford & Simpson, Chaka Khan and studio musicians Gadd, Gale, MacDonald and Tee to turn it into a single. Ashford & Simpson and Khan featured as vocalists while George Young was playing alto saxophone. The song was included on Jones' 1978 album Sounds...And Stuff Like That!. The single spent one week at number one on the R&B singles chart, for the week ending 1 July 1978, and peaked at number 21 on the Billboard Hot 100 singles chart.

For his 1995 album Q's Jook Joint Jones modernized the song. This time vocals were provided by Ashford & Simpson, Khan, Brandy, Charlie Wilson and Ray Charles while Greg Phillinganes was playing keyboards. In 2002 the song was featured in a Peter Lindbergh-directed Gap TV commercial starring Will Kemp, this time credited to QJ's Jook Joint and Brothers Johnson.

Charts

References

External links
 

1978 songs
1978 singles
Brandy Norwood songs
Soul songs
Songs written by Nickolas Ashford
Songs written by Valerie Simpson
Songs written by Ralph MacDonald
Songs written by Quincy Jones
Quincy Jones songs
Chaka Khan songs
A&M Records singles